Helmut Link (February 6, 1927 – February 26, 2009) was a German politician of the Christian Democratic Union (CDU) and former member of the German Bundestag.

Life 
Link joined the CDU in 1957 and was a member of the Frankfurt city council for the CDU from 1960 to 1969. In the 1969 federal elections Link was elected to the German Bundestag via the Hessian state list of the CDU. Link remained a member of the German Bundestag until 1990 and was initially always elected via the Hessian state list. In 1983 and 1987 he was elected directly in the Bundestag election district Frankfurt am Main III.

Literature

References

1927 births
2009 deaths
Members of the Bundestag for Hesse
Members of the Bundestag 1987–1990
Members of the Bundestag 1983–1987
Members of the Bundestag 1980–1983
Members of the Bundestag 1976–1980
Members of the Bundestag 1972–1976
Members of the Bundestag 1969–1972
Members of the Bundestag for the Christian Democratic Union of Germany